The Texas Tech Lady Raiders basketball program competes in the National Collegiate Athletic Association's (NCAA) Division I, representing Texas Tech University in the Big 12 Conference. The program has had 7 head coaches since it began play during the 1975–76 basketball season.

Key

Statistics 
Statistics correct as of the end of the 2010–11 NCAA Division I women's basketball season

Notes

References
General

Specific

Texas Tech

Lady Raiders basketball, coaches
Texas Tech Lady Raiders basketball, coaches